Sherlock Jr. is a 2018 Philippine television drama crime series broadcast by GMA Network. Directed by Rechie del Carmen, it stars Ruru Madrid in the title role. It premiered on January 29, 2018 on the network's Telebabad line up replacing Super Ma'am. The series concluded on April 27, 2018, with a total of 63 episodes. It was replaced by The Cure in its timeslot.

The series is streaming online on YouTube.

Premise
Jack and Irene are happily in love with each other. When Irene's motivation is to expose the truth, she finds herself in trouble along with her friend, Lily. Jack and Irene's dog, Serena investigates to find the truth about what happened to Irene and Lily.

Cast and characters

Lead cast
 Ruru Madrid as Sherlock "Jack" Jackson Jr.

Supporting cast
 Gabbi Garcia as Lily Pelaez
 Serena as Siri
 Mikee Quintos as Siri's voice
 Ai-Ai delas Alas as Perla Calubaquib-Nuñez
 Tonton Gutierrez as Lawrence Carazo
 Andre Paras as Elpidio "Pido" Lumabao III
 Roi Vinzon as Conrado "Rado" Nuñez
 Sharmaine Arnaiz as Lorraine Pelaez
 Rochelle Barrameda as Carolina Almendraz-Carazo
 Matt Evans as Dindo Carazo
 Kate Valdez as Jenny Nuñez
 Sofia Pablo as Caray Nuñez
 Alyana Asistio as Diosdada "Diosa" Mamaril

Guest cast
 Janine Gutierrez as Irene Manansala
 Carlo Gonzales as Bernardo Matias
 Camille Canlas as Desiree
 Hiro Peralta as Bart Lopez
 Prince Villanueva as Ron
 Analyn Barro as Liz
 Nicole Kim Donesa as Cassandra "Sandeng" Lopez / Cass
 Paolo Contis as Albert
 LJ Reyes as Meryl
 Aaron Yanga as Jerry
 Melanie Marquez as Louella De Villa
 Marc Abaya as Carl
 Mika dela Cruz as Michelle
 Lia Valentin as Sophie
 Kiel Rodriguez as Bert
 Mosang as Nene
 Jana Victoria as Eden
 Rich Asuncion as Patricia
 Rafael Rosell as Gregor Jackson 
 Sophie Albert as Erika
 Marco Alcaraz as Mark
 Rob Rownd as Sherlock Jackson Sr.
 Valeen Montenegro as Mylene / Audrey Velasco

Ratings
According to AGB Nielsen Philippines' Nationwide Urban Television Audience Measurement People in television homes, the pilot episode of Sherlock Jr. earned an 11.4% rating.

Accolades

References

External links
 
 

2018 Philippine television series debuts
2018 Philippine television series endings
Filipino-language television shows
GMA Network drama series
Philippine crime television series
Television shows set in the Philippines